Ryan's Law is a South Carolina law which requires insurance companies to cover treatments for autism. The law states that insurance companies must provide up to $50,000, annually, on behavioral therapy, up to the age of 16. The law provides coverage for various treatments, including Applied Behavior Analysis, which was previously denied as "experimental". Ryan's Law also prohibits insurers from refusing other medical care to children because of their autism. The law does not apply to people who (or companies which) are self-insured.

The bill was authored by Lorri Unumb, who was at the time a law professor at the Charleston School of Law, and the mother of a four-year-old autistic boy, after whom the law is named.  Passage of the legislation took nearly two years, and was the result of an intense grassroots campaign which was orchestrated by Unumb and supported by hundreds of families in South Carolina.  Lacking funds to hire a lobbyist, Unumb and the supporters, known as the Ryan’s Law Grassroots Gang, personally lobbied South Carolina legislators through visits and letter-writing campaigns.  The bill was passed in May  2007, and the law went into effect in July 2008.

Terminology related to autism
The term "autism" is used in different ways.  It can be used to refer to autistic disorder, or it can be used to refer to any or all of the three conditions on the autism spectrum,  autism, Asperger syndrome and PDD-NOS.  Under the fourth edition of the Diagnostic and Statistical Manual of Mental Disorders (DSM-IV), the three conditions on the autism spectrum belong to a broader class known as Pervasive Developmental Disorders (PDD), which also includes Rett syndrome and childhood disintegrative disorder.

Passage of the bill

Initial filing
The bill was written by Unumb and pre-filed in the South Carolina legislature in late 2005.  Rep. Nathan Ballentine (R-Irmo) was the primary sponsor in the South Carolina House of Representatives, and Rep. Ray Cleary (R-Murrell's Inlet) was the primary sponsor in the South Carolina Senate.  The companion House and Senate bills were first considered by the South Carolina legislature during the 2006 session.  The Senate bill (S.958) was assigned to the Senate Banking and Insurance Committee, where it received strong support from the committee's chairman, Senator David Thomas (R-Greenville).  Thomas created a subcommittee, which held a public hearing on the bill on January 12, 2006; this hearing was attended by hundreds of supporters.  Witnesses in support of the bill included Unumb, Dr. Gina Green, Dr. Jane Charles, Dr. Shelley Holstrum, Dr. Scott Edwards, and Walt Jenner, among others.

Medicaid waiver
In the South Carolina House of Representatives, the bill (H.4351) was assigned to the House Labor, Commerce and Industry Committee (LCI), chaired by Rep. Harry Cato.  During public hearings before the Insurance Subcommittee of LCI, the House bill was amended considerably as part of a deal struck by the insurance industry and some legislators.  The insurance language was removed from the bill, and was replaced by language directing the South Carolina Department of Health and Human Services and the Department of Disabilities and Special Needs to set up a government program to benefit children with autism.  As amended, the bill passed in 2006.  Shortly thereafter, South Carolina applied to the federal government for a Medicaid waiver, in order to establish the Pervasive Developmental Disorders waiver program.  Through this program, parents of autistic children aged 3 through 11 could apply for funding to cover an Applied Behavior Analysis therapy program for their child.  Each child could receive up to $50,000 in funding, annually, for up to 3 years.  In 2007, approximately one hundred children in South Carolina began receiving therapy services under the new program, and by 2009, over four hundred children were receiving services.

Return to legislature
In 2007, the Ryan's Law Grassroots Gang, led by Unumb, Lisa Rollins, and Marcella Ridley, returned to the South Carolina legislature to make another attempt to pass the insurance legislation.  This time, the House bill (H.3468) was sponsored by Rep. Skipper Perry (R-Aiken), with continued support from Nathan Ballentine, lead sponsor in 2006.  The Senate bill (S.20) was sponsored by Sen. Dick Elliott (D-Myrtle Beach), with continued support from the 2006 lead sponsor, Sen. Ray Cleary.

Additional hearings were held on the companion bills during the 2007 session, and numerous legislators co-sponsored the bills.  Sen. Joel Lourie (D-Columbia) played an instrumental role in arranging negotiations between those in favor of the bill and those representing the insurance companies, and in furthering discussions during intense deadline pressure.  On May 25, 2007, the General Assembly passed the Senate bill.

Veto and override
In a turn of events, South Carolina Governor Mark Sanford vetoed the bill on June 6, 2007, the penultimate night of the 2007 legislative session. The next morning—the last day of the legislative session—the Ryan's Law Grassroots Gang showed up in force at the South Carolina State House to plead with the legislators to put their bill on the day's agenda, and to override the governor's veto.  On June 7, 2007, the South Carolina Senate overrode the governor's veto on a voice vote, and the South Carolina House overrode the veto on a roll call vote.  Both chambers' override votes were unanimous, creating a dramatic and emotional ending. In April 2008, CNN profiled the passage of Ryan's Law.

Summary of the law
Ryan's Law applies to people with a condition on the autism spectrum: either autistic disorder, Asperger syndrome, or PDD-NOS. It mandates that insurance companies provide up to $50,000 a year of coverage for behavioral therapy until the age of 16. The child must be diagnosed at age eight or before, and the $50,000 maximum on behavioral therapy is to be adjusted every year on January 1 based on the Consumer Price Index. It further prohibits insurance companies from refusing autistic children other medical treatment or attention on the basis of their condition. Autism cannot be used as a basis for refusing care for other medically reasonable or necessary treatment or procedures.  The bill does not cover individuals who are insured through employers that have self-funded plans.  Such plans are not subject to state regulation and are governed by federal ERISA law.  In 2009, federal legislation was introduced in both chambers of the United States Congress to require self-funded plans to offer autism benefits.

References

External links
Text of the law: from South Carolina Code of Laws, Title 38 (Insurance), Chapter 71 (Accident and health insurance); see Section 38-71-280.
A flowchart for determining whether a child with autism in South Carolina is covered by Ryan's Law

Sociological and cultural aspects of autism
Social problems in medicine